The decade of the 1620s in archaeology involved some significant events.

Explorations

Excavations

Finds
 1621: Ludovisi Battle sarcophagus in Rome.

Events
 1625: Last cannon salvaged from English ship Revenge (sank following Battle of Flores (1591))

Births
 1620: 15 February - François Charpentier, French archaeologist (d. 1702)
 1626: 12 March - John Aubrey, English antiquary (d. 1697)

Deaths
 1629: Antonio Bosio, Italian scholar (b. 1575/1576)

References

Archaeology by decade
Archaeology